Marcel Nico Andreas Heinig (born on 16 November 1981 in Cottbus) is a German extreme sportsman who has had his greatest success in decatriathlons, which are more than fifty times the distance of the Olympic Distance Triathlon. He scored his biggest victory by winning the gold medal at the World Championships in Decatriathlon (10x Ironman Hawaii) in 2008.

Heinig attended Leonardo da Vinci School in Cottbus. In his youth, Heinig skipped physical education and did everything possible to dodge sports activities. He was 40 kg overweight and very unsportsmanlike. However, when he joined the army in 2001, he could no longer avoid intense physical activity. He faced problems due to being overweight during the Physical Fitness Test, drills and orientation process. However, seven years later, the once unathletic Marcel became the youngest World Champion in the history of the Decatriathlon.

Achievements and titles 
 Worldwide youngest member of the "100 Marathon Club" (Germany), 2005
 Age group- and Group world record in the 10-day-triathlon, 2006
 World Cup Champion International Ultra Triathlon Association, 2008
 World Champion Decatriathlon, 2008
 Worldrecord overall in the 10-Days-Triathlon, 2009

References

External links 

 Official website

1981 births
Living people
German male triathletes
German male long-distance runners
German ultramarathon runners
Endurance games
Sportspeople from Cottbus
Male ultramarathon runners